Oumer Hussien Oba (born 15 September 1972) is an Ethiopian politician  and the current Minister of Agriculture of the Federal Democratic Republic of Ethiopia since 23 October 2018. He is a member of the Oromia regional parliament and a member of the ruling Prosperity Party.

Early life and education 
Oumer was born in Tijo, Arsi Zone, Oromia. He received his BA in economics in Ethiopia and MBA from Greenwich University, London, United Kingdom

Career 
Mr. Oumer was served as head of Arsi Zone Finance and Revenues Bureau later Vice President of the Oromia Regional Government and Head of Bureaus of Urban Development and Agriculture. Before assuming office as Minister of Agriculture, Umer was assigned as Director General of Ethiopian Revenues & Customs Authority with the rank of Minister on April 19, 2018.

See also
 Council of Ministers, Ethiopia

References

External links 

Living people
21st-century Ethiopian politicians
Year of birth missing (living people)
Alumni of the University of Greenwich
People from Oromia Region
Oromo people
Oromo politicians
Government ministers of Ethiopia
Agriculture ministers